Jonathan Broughton (born 1 July 1969) is a retired British international swimmer.

Swimming career
Broughton competed in the men's 4 × 200 metre freestyle relay at the 1988 Summer Olympics. He represented England and won a bronze medal in the 4 x 200 metres freestyle relay, at the 1986 Commonwealth Games in Edinburgh, Scotland. Four years later, he represented England in the freestyle events, at the 1990 Commonwealth Games in Auckland, New Zealand. He is also a two times winner of the ASA National Championship title in the 200 metres freestyle (1987 and 1989).

References

External links
 

1969 births
Living people
British male swimmers
Olympic swimmers of Great Britain
Swimmers at the 1988 Summer Olympics
People from Colne
Commonwealth Games medallists in swimming
Commonwealth Games bronze medallists for England
Swimmers at the 1986 Commonwealth Games
Medallists at the 1986 Commonwealth Games